Union Township is one of the fourteen townships of Union County, Ohio, United States.  The 2010 census found 1,763 people in the township, 792 of whom lived in the village of Milford Center.

Geography
Located in the southwestern corner of the county, it borders the following townships:
Allen Township - north
Paris Township - northeast
Darby Township - east
Pike Township, Madison County - south
Goshen Township, Champaign County - southwest
Rush Township, Champaign County - west

The village of Milford Center is located in northern Union Township, and the unincorporated community of Irwin lies in the township's southwest.

Name and history
Union Township was established in 1820. It is one of twenty-seven Union Townships statewide.

Government
The township is governed by a three-member board of trustees, who are elected in November of odd-numbered years to a four-year term beginning on the following January 1. Two are elected in the year after the presidential election and one is elected in the year before it. There is also an elected township fiscal officer, who serves a four-year term beginning on April 1 of the year after the election, which is held in November of the year before the presidential election. Vacancies in the fiscal officership or on the board of trustees are filled by the remaining trustees.

References

External links
County website

Townships in Union County, Ohio
Townships in Ohio